Novo Basquete Brasil (NBB) (English: New Basketball Brazil) is the Brazilian premier professional men's basketball league. It is organized by the Liga Nacional de Basquete (LNB) (National Basketball League), in a new format of Brazil's previous top-tier level basketball competition, the Campeonato Brasileiro de Basquete (Brazilian Basketball Championship). The NBB is managed by the Brazilian basketball associations, which were founding members of the LNB.

Format
The NBB is the annual basketball league that is promoted by the national Brazilian league (LNB) organizing body, and is endorsed by the Brazilian Basketball Confederation (CFB). The first phase of the season consists of fifteen teams playing against each other, on a home and away basis. Then the top eight teams go to the playoffs, where the top ranked team plays against the one in the eighth place, the second from the top plays the seventh, and so on. Each playoff series is a best-of-five, apart from the championship final, which is a single game. In all of those, the best placed team has the home court advantage. Finally, the best placed teams in the league qualify to the South American top-tier level FIBA Americas League and the South American second-tier level FIBA South American League.

LOB

The NBB has a promotion and relegation format with the Brazilian second-tier level league, the Liga Ouro de Basquete (LOB) (Gold Basketball League). The worst performing teams of each NBB season are relegated down to the second-tier level LOB, while the best performing teams of each LOB season are promoted up to the top-tier level NBB.

LDB

The NBB also features an Under-20 age development league, called the Liga de Desenvolvimento de Basquete (LDB) (Developmental Basketball League).

History

2009 season
The NBB inaugural season didn't have the participation of founding-members Iguaçu, Londrina, Ulbra/Rio Claro, and Uberlândia.

2009–10 season
For the second NBB edition, the LNB confirmed the participation of 14 teams. Limeira and Bira-Lajeado could not keep their squads, thus did not join the season. On the other hand, Londrina joined the League, while an Araraquara/Palmeiras deal brought back to the national competition one of the most traditional Brazilian clubs.

2010–11 season
The 15 teams from the previous season confirmed their participation. The third NBB edition also featured former national and South American champions Uberlândia, who managed to gather a strong squad sponsored by Brasília's former partner, Universo. After a one-year hiatus, Limeira returned to the League. Besides that, first-timers Rio Claro and Iguaçu joined as well.

2012–13 season
For the first time, the NBB had eighteen participating teams, a record in the NBB's history. The three-time champion, Brasília, came once again as the title favorite. But their greatest rival Flamengo, assembled a team to break this hegemony, and thus win the NBB after four years. Uberlândia emerged as one of the favorites for the title, as well as São José. The rookies were the teams of Suzano, Mogi das Cruzes, Palmeiras, and Basquete Cearense. Of the four, the only team to qualify for the playoffs was Basquete Cearense. The last two were Tijuca and Suzano. Suzano, due to financial difficulties, dismounted their team to the championship final, while Tijuca played a small promotion tournament with Fluminense and Macaé, respectively champion and runner-up of Supercopa Brasil de Basquete. In the playoffs, a surprise: the champions of the past three editions were eliminated in the quarterfinals by São José. In the semifinals, Flamengo eliminated São José 3–2, and Uberlândia swept Bauru by 3–0. The final, played in one game in Rio de Janeiro, was won by the super-team of Flamengo, who after four years, won their second title of the NBB.

NBB rivalries

Founding members

Current teams

NBB Finals

NBB championships performance by club

NBB awards

All-Star Weekend

Similarly to other basketball leagues around the world, the NBB organises an all-star game in which its showcases the best players of the league. In addition to the game, a dunk contest, three-point contest and "Skills Challenge" are organised.

Notable players

  Rafael "Bábby" Araújo
  Leandro Barbosa
  Anderson Varejão
  Vítor Benite
  Valtinho da Silva
  Bruno Caboclo
  Gui Santos
  Cristiano Felício
  Alex Garcia
  Guilherme Giovannoni
  Vítor Faverani
  Didi Louzada
  Rafael Luz
  Duda Machado
  Marcelinho Machado
  Carlos Olivinha
  Raul Neto
  Fab Melo
  Anderson Varejão
  Marquinhos Vieira
  Lucas Nogueira
 / Larry Taylor
  Juan Pablo Figueroa
  Walter Herrmann
  Federico Kammerichs
  Nicolás Laprovíttola
  Facundo Sucatzky
  Franco Balbi
  Joel Muñoz
  Ronald Ramón
  Darington Hobson
  Marc Brown
  Robby Collum
  Tyrone Curnell
  Robert Day
  Kyle Fuller
  Desmond Holloway
  David Jackson
  Kyle Lamonte
  Jerome Meyinsse
  Bernard Robinson
  Joseph Shipp
  Shamell Stallworth
  Rashad McCants

See also
Brazilian Championship
São Paulo State Championship
Rio de Janeiro State Championship

References

External links
Official website 
New Basketball Brazil at Latinbasket.com

    
2008 establishments in Brazil
Novo
Brasil
Sports leagues established in 2008
Professional sports leagues in Brazil